Namogoo Technologies Ltd. is a Digital Journey Continuity software as a service platform, that autonomously adapts to each customer visit in real-time, that helps improve online customer journeys and business results for global retail brands. Namogoo's Customer Hijacking Prevention identifies and blocks unauthorized ad injections from diverting online shoppers to competitors. Namogoo's Intent-Based Promotions predicts and individualizes the minimum promotion for each visit — synchronizing customer intent with company business goals.

History
Namogoo was founded in August 2014 by entrepreneurs Chemi Katz and Ohad Greenshpan. In December 2014, the company launched its Customer Hijacking Prevention platform, which detects and blocks malicious content and unauthorized ads injected onto visitor sessions.

In September 2014, Namogoo received an initial funding round of $6 million — led by Blumberg Capital and Inimiti Capital.

In April 2017, Namogoo opened its Sales Headquarters in Boston, Mass.

In February 2017, Namogoo raised $8 million in Series A funding, led by GreatPoint Ventures. Blumberg Capital and Inimiti Capital also participated in the round.

In May 2018, Namogoo received a Series B investment round of $15 million led by Hanaco Ventures, as well existing investors GreatPoint Ventures, Blumberg Capital and Inimiti Capital.

In May 2018, Namogoo was received a 2018 MITX Award in the Technology Innovation in Retail & eCommerce category. The annual awards are hosted by The Massachusetts Innovation & Technology Exchange (MITX) and given to technologies that impact the future of customer experience.

In June 2018, Namogoo was named a 2018 Cool Vendor in Digital Commerce by research and advisory firm Gartner. Companies selected for the Cool Vendor Report meet Gartner's criteria as technologies that are innovative, impactful and intriguing.

In September 2019, Namogoo was ranked as the Best Startup to Work For in Israel by Dun & Bradstreet(D&B). This was the first year that D&B's annual rankings included a category for startups in addition to its list of Top 50 Companies to Work For in Israel.

In October 2019, Namogoo raised a Series C funding round of $40 million led by Oak HC/FT as well as existing investors GreatPoint Ventures, Hanaco Venture Capital, and Blumberg Capital. This brought the company's total funding to $69 million.

In February 2020, Namogoo appointed Liz Ritzcovan as Chief Revenue Office based in New York, and Einat Etzioni as Chief Marketing Officer based in Israel.

In May 2020, Namogoo completed its strategic acquisition of behavioral analytics platform Personali.

In January 2021, Namogoo launched Intent-Based Promotions, which autonomously optimizes promotion spend by synchronizing eCommerce brands’ business goals with real-time shopper intent, preventing customer journey abandonment and increasing revenue

Technology
Namogoo's cloud-based service, built on proprietary, Machine Learning technology, detects and blocks invasive content spread across ecommerce sites. This learning technology monitors and analyzes millions of web sessions from the server all the way to customer browsers — and based on pattern analysis techniques — classifies web activity and prevents it from running. Namogoo's proactive core engine leverages thousands of data points related to deep content inspection, statistical analysis, and indicative behavioral patterns in order to reach decisions. By identifying and blocking Customer Journey Hijacking activities that divert earned traffic and hurt conversion rates, ecommerce businesses are able to preserve the intended online experience and improve business metrics.

Customer Journey Hijacking
Customer Journey Hijacking is a rapidly growing phenomenon where unauthorized ads are injected into consumer browsers. Various injected ads include competing product recommendation widgets, banners, pop-ups, and in-text redirects which are inserted into the visitor's web session. Ads are driven by digital malware that is downloaded through bad connections, free software bundles, and unsecured WiFi networks. This disrupts the intended online experience, and diverts earned web traffic away from ecommerce websites, cutting directly into their conversions and revenue. The majority of these injected ads redirect customers to competitor websites and promotions. Unsavory content is also featured across the site and impacts brand equity. Ad injections run on the consumer's browser and bypass server-side visibility or control over this activity.

References

External links
 Official Website
 Company Blog

Computer security software companies
Companies based in Boston
Online advertising methods